Ukrainian Australians refers to Australian citizens of Ukrainian descent, or Ukraine-born people who emigrated to Australia. They are an ethnic minority in Australia, numbering about 38,000 people according to the 2011 Census. Currently, the main concentrations of Ukrainians are located in the cities of Sydney and Melbourne.

History

One of the first Ukrainian migrants to Australia was Mykhailo Hryb, who in the 1860s established a sheep farm. A notable Ukrainian who visited Australia was Nicholas Miklouho-Maclay, an ethnographer and naturalist who came to Australia in 1878, and besides scientific and ethnographic studies, was responsible for the building of Australia's first biological field station at Watsons Bay in NSW.

Prior to World War I, up to 5,000 Ukrainians migrated to Australia, with some settling in communities in Brisbane. However, the main body of Ukrainians emigrated to Australia along with other nationalities in the post-World War II wave of refugees from Europe. These refugees were called "displaced persons" and started arriving in 1948 as part of the International Refugee Organization resettlement agreement or on assisted passages which included 2-year work contracts with the Australian Government. The 1947 Australian Census did not list Ukraine as a birthplace, though the 1954 Census recorded 14,757 as Ukraine-born.

The number of migrants from Soviet Ukraine was minimal, though there was a limited migration of Ukrainians from communities in Poland and Yugoslavia. In 1991 Ukraine gained independence, and over the next five years the Ukraine-born population increased for the first time in many decades, in Victoria from 2,937 in 1991 to 5,370 in 1996. Many of these new post-independence migrants were young professionals in the fields of science, mathematics and computer technology.

According to the 2011 Census, today there is an active Ukrainian community of about 38,000 people, with most of them living in Melbourne and Sydney. There are active Ukrainian communities and centres in Geelong, Brisbane, Perth, Adelaide and Canberra, with smaller centres in Queanbeyan, Hobart, Newcastle, Moe, Albury-Wodonga, Northam and Noble Park.

In March 2022, the Australian government granted temporary visas to approximately 5,000 Ukrainians fleeing the Russian invasion of their country, In total, Australia has granted 8,500 visas to Ukrainian refugees since the war started.

Organisations 

The Australian Federation of Ukrainian Organisations is the umbrella organisation that represents the Ukrainian community in Australia. Each State has a number of Ukrainian community associations, or hromadas. The Ukrainian Council of NSW represents the Ukrainian hromadas in New South Wales.

The Ukrainian community in Australia was very active in the formation of a variety of cultural organisations, including choirs, folk dancing groups, and arts organisations like the "Ukrainian Artists Society of Australia".

As well, there are Australian versions of Ukrainian youth organisations such as Plast and the Ukrainian Youth Association.

In addition, an aged care facility exists, called Kalyna Care, catering to cultural and care requirements of elderly community members.

Notable people

Maurice Abraham Cohen, educator
Rachael Finch, model
Taras Gomulka, footballer
Alex Jesaulenko, Australian rules footballer
Michael Kmit, painter
Harry Messel, educator
Dmytro Nytczenko, writer
Bohdan Nyskohus, footballer
Jared Petrenko, Australian rules footballer
Nikita Rukavytsya, footballer
Elen Levon, singer
Matthew Guy, Victorian Liberal MP
Katia Tiutiunnik, Composer
Andrew Rovenko, Photographer

See also 
Australia–Ukraine relations
European Australians
Europeans in Oceania
Immigration to Australia
Ukrainian New Zealanders
Ukrainian diaspora
Belarusian Australians
Polish Australians

References

External links 

 
 
 ozeukes.com — Ukrainian community in Australia

Immigration to Australia
European Australian
 
Ukrainian diaspora in Australia